Denmar is an unincorporated community in Pocahontas County, West Virginia, United States.

The name Denmar is an amalgamation of Dennison and Maryland, the later the native state of the former, a first settler.

References

Unincorporated communities in Pocahontas County, West Virginia
Unincorporated communities in West Virginia